Praia may refer to:

Places

Cape Verde:
Praia, the capital city of Cape Verde
Praia (municipality), the municipality where the above city is located
Azores, Portugal:
Praia (Santa Cruz da Graciosa), a parish in the district of Santa Cruz da Graciosa
Praia do Almoxarife, a parish in the district of Horta
Praia do Norte, a parish in the district of Horta
Praia da Vitória, a parish and a district in the island of Terceira
Brazil:
Praia Grande, a municipality in the state of São Paulo
Italy:
Praia a Mare, a municipality of the Province of Cosenza

Other
 Praia (genus) is a genus of sawflies in the family of Cimbicidae